Dragon Creek may refer to 
Dragon Creek in Cariboo region of British Columbia, Canada
Dragon Creek in Anamur district of Mersin Province, Turkey
Dragon Creek (Delaware River tributary), a stream in New Castle County, Delaware, USA

See also 
Dragon River Bridge